Gheorghi Arnaoudov (born 18 March 1957) is a Bulgarian composer of stage, orchestral, chamber, film, vocal, and piano music. His work has roots in minimal music.

Life
Gheorghi Arnaoudov was born in 1957 in Sofia and graduated in composition with Alexander Tanev and contemporary music with Bojidar Spassov from the State Academy of Music Pancho Vladigerov. At the same time, he attended summer courses working with Brian Ferneyhough and Ton de Leeuw.

His artistic career started in the early 1980s. At the same time, he did research work in the fields of electronic music, music theory and musique concrète, as well as ancient far-Eastern and ancient Greek music.

He has won many international and national awards, including the Grand Prix of the European Broadcasting Union (1985), the Golden Harp Prize from Jeunesses Musicales (1985), the Special Prize of the Union of Bulgarian Composers (1986), and the Carl Maria von Weber International Prize for Music (1989).

He is the author of scientific and theoretical articles in music, as well as of reviews in musical and scientific periodicals, mainly in the spheres of the aesthetics of modernism and postmodernism, communications in the music, the contemporary arts, musical semiotics, and the theory of contemporary music.

In 2000 Gega New released a CD with Arnaoudov's music called "Thyepoleo. Orphic Mysterial Rites". The texts used by the composer are the original preserved Orphic hymns. For this project he consulted renowned Thracologist Alexander Fol, who wrote the programme notes.

To date Arnaoudov has produced numerous symphonies, oratorios, concertos and has won several international prizes. He currently teaches in the Theatre and Music departments of New Bulgarian University. In 2009 he was appointed associate professor in Composition and Harmony.

The antecedents of his music can be found in Alexander Scriabin, Olivier Messiaen, the Edgard Varèse and, more recently, in the work of Krzysztof Penderecki and Arvo Pärt. The influence of composers like Anton Webern and Morton Feldman is shown in the lack of any kind of conventional process or development.

In a series of works of Gheorghi Arnaoudov composer's vision is directed towards attaining a new aesthetic of pure music (Adorno), aestheticizing renaissance sound purity. By using various techniques (including also techniques legitimizing the language of Musical Avant-garde) and their substance rethinking is achieved a new music-sensuous semantic field.

Works

Stage
Offertorium Idance theater after Herman Broch (1988)
Offertorium II (after Jorge Luis Borges) (1991)
Transpatium (ballet) (1996)
Choreordained (two-act ballet) (1996)
"...the highest point of my inferiority..." (1998)
"Black Box, dance theater(1998)
Threshold, dance theater (2001)

Orchestral
Symphony No. 1 (1984)
Concerto for Orchestra (1986)
Concerto grosso (1987)
Kammerkonzert (1988)
Symphony No. 2 (1990)
Laus Solis (1996)
The Colour of the Light (1997)
Variations on a Theme by Rachmaninov (2001)
Concierto Barroco, after Alejo Carpentier (2007)
"Liber Canticorum" Chapter I - Imaginary opera scenes, for soprano, tenor and orchestra based on a texts by Horace (2008)
Passio et mors Domini nostri Jesu Christi secundum Liber Psalmorum for bass, soprano, choir and orchestra (2008)
Hymns to the spring, Nikolai Liliev (2008)
Concerto for Violin, Strings, Percussion and Keyboards (2008–10)

Chamber
String Quartet No. 2 (1988)
Ritual III (Borges Fragment) (1993)
Vihaya (1995)
Thyepolia (1997)
Kells (1999)
Variations for two pianos and percussion (2001)
Fantasmagorias – El libro de los seres imaginarios (Imaginarium super Jorge Luis Borges) for string quartet (2010)

Vocal
Footnote (...und Isolde/ns Winkfall lassen) for soprano and chamber orchestra based on the poem "A Prayer" by James Joyce (1991)
Summe Deus (1991)
The Circle of Rites (1991)
The Way of the Birds I, for soprano, flute and violin (1995)
The Way of the Birds II for soprano and chamber ensemble (1996)
The Way of the Birds III, for soprano, clarinet, violin, cello and percussion (1996)
Thyepoleo (2000)

Piano
Paysages sonores (1983)
Partita I (1984)
Ritual I (1988)
Incarnation in the Light (Ritual II) (1993)
"...un pan de ciel au milieu du silence...", after René Magritte (1993)
Svarog Ritual (1994)
Le temple du silence for two pianos (1996)
Et iterum venturus (1997)
Forgotten Songs (2005)
Monodies (2009)
Le Rappel des Rameaux (2009)

References
 Kostakeva, Maria 1994-2007. Musik in Geschichte und Gegenwart (MGG) The Biographical Encyclopedia. Bärenreiter und Metzler.
 Myers, Greg 2001. New Grove Dictionary of Music and Musicians by Stanley Sadie. Oxford University Press.
 Blum, Tobias. 2004. "Sakrale Einfachheit und wilde Energie" General Anzeiger (October 12).
 Maycock, Robert. 2007. "Voland Quartet, The Wigmore Hall, London" The Independent (January 4).
 Bruhn, Siglind 2014. "Europas klingende Bilder"  Eine musikalische Reise, Waldkirch: Edition Gorz

Notes

External links
 
 Classical Composers Database
 The Living Composers Project
 Union of Bulgarian Composers Database
 The Modern Word - Borges Music
 The Modern Word - Joyce Music
 Free scores by Gheorghi Arnaoudov in the New Bulgarian University Scholar Electronic Repository

1957 births
Musicians from Sofia
Living people
Bulgarian classical composers
21st-century classical composers
Male classical composers
21st-century male musicians